Kaveh Metro Station is a station on Isfahan Metro Line 1. The station opened on 15 October 2015. It is located at Kaveh Bus Terminal, on Kaveh Boulevard in Isfahan. The station will serve as an inter-provincial passenger hub, as there is the bus terminal there, and there are plans for Tehran-Qom-Isfahan High Speed Rail to terminate at this location too. The next station on the north side is Jaber Station and on the southeast side Shahid Chamran Station.

References

Isfahan Metro stations
Railway stations opened in 2015